Events from the year 1885 in Canada.

Incumbents

Crown 
 Monarch – Victoria

Federal government 
 Governor General – Henry Petty-Fitzmaurice 
 Prime Minister – John A. Macdonald
 Chief Justice – William Johnstone Ritchie (New Brunswick)
 Parliament – 5th

Provincial governments

Lieutenant governors 
Lieutenant Governor of British Columbia – Clement Francis Cornwall 
Lieutenant Governor of Manitoba – James Cox Aikins 
Lieutenant Governor of New Brunswick – Robert Duncan Wilmot (until November 11) then Samuel Leonard Tilley  
Lieutenant Governor of Nova Scotia – Matthew Henry Richey    
Lieutenant Governor of Ontario – John Beverley Robinson   
Lieutenant Governor of Prince Edward Island – Andrew Archibald Macdonald
Lieutenant Governor of Quebec – Louis-Rodrigue Masson

Premiers    
Premier of British Columbia – William Smithe 
Premier of Manitoba – John Norquay 
Premier of New Brunswick – Andrew George Blair  
Premier of Nova Scotia – William Stevens Fielding  
Premier of Ontario – Oliver Mowat    
Premier of Prince Edward Island – William Wilfred Sullivan 
Premier of Quebec – John Jones Ross

Territorial governments

Lieutenant governors 
 Lieutenant Governor of Keewatin – James Cox Aikins
 Lieutenant Governor of the North-West Territories – Edgar Dewdney

Events
March 26 – Louis Riel and the Métis battle the North-West Mounted Police at Duck Lake
March 30 – North-West Rebellion: The Looting of Battleford begins. It will continue until April 24 when the Militia reach the town.
April 2 – North-West Rebellion: In the Frog Lake Massacre, Cree warriors kill nine settler civilians and take 70 captive
April 24 – North-West Rebellion: Battle of Fish Creek fought between Canadian Militia and the Métis
May 2 – North-West Rebellion: Battle of Cut Knife
May 9–12 – North-West Rebellion: Battle of Batoche the Métis are defeated in battle
May 15 – Riel surrenders near Batoche, District of Saskatchewan, and is arrested
May 28 – North-West Rebellion: Battle of Frenchman's Butte
June 3 – North-West Rebellion: Battle of Loon Lake. The last Cree resistance is shattered.
July 2 – Big Bear captured.
July 6 – Riel is charged with six counts of high treason.
July 20 – The trial of Louis Riel begins in Regina, District of Assiniboia
July 20 – The Chinese Immigration Act of 1885 was enacted. The Act imposed a $50 head tax on Chinese immigrants, with the exceptions of diplomats, government representatives, tourists, merchants, "men of science", and students. The Act came after a big wave of Chinese immigrants going to Canada.
August 1 – Riel is found guilty and sentenced to death
September 9 – The Manitoba Court of Queen's Bench dismisses Riel's appeal
September 15 – Northwest Territories election
October 22 – The Judicial Committee of the Privy Council refuses to hear Riel's appeal
October 31 – Newfoundland election: Robert Thorburn's Reforms win a majority
November 7 – The Last Spike of the Canadian Pacific Railway at Craigellachie, British Columbia. John A. Macdonald receives a telegram announcing that the first train from Montreal in Quebec is approaching the Pacific.
November 16 – Riel is hanged in Regina.
November 27 – Hangings at Battleford: Wandering Spirit, Round the Sky, Bad Arrow, Miserable Man, Iron Body, Little Bear, Crooked Leg and Man Without Blood are hanged for murders committed during the Frog Lake Massacre and the Looting of Battleford. It is the largest mass execution in Canadian history.

Full date unknown
Banff Hot Springs Reserve is established. It will be renamed Rocky Mountains Park in 1887 the first national park in Canada and then Banff National Park in 1930.
Canada outlaws the potlatch ceremony among Northwest Coast tribes. The law, often ignored, is repealed in 1951.

Births

January to June
January 11 – Gordon Daniel Conant, lawyer, politician and 12th Premier of Ontario (d.1953)
January 13 – Alfred Fuller, businessman (d.1973)
February 4 – Cairine Wilson, Canada's first female Senator (d.1962)
April 3 – Allan Dwan, film director, producer and screenwriter (d.1981)
April 9 – Frank Patrick O'Connor, businessman, politician and philanthropist (d. 1939)
May 8 – Thomas B. Costain, journalist and historical novelist (d.1965)
June 27 – Arthur Lismer, painter and member of the Group of Seven (d.1969)

July to December
July 23 – Izaak Walton Killam, financier (d.1955)
July 31 – Charles Avery Dunning, politician, Minister and university chancellor (d.1958)
October 23 – Lawren Harris, Group of Seven painter (d.1970)
November 5 – Edgar Sydney Little, politician (d.1943)
December 5 – Ernest Cormier, engineer and architect (d.1980)
December 24 – Abraham Albert Heaps, politician and labor leader (d.1954)

Deaths
January 13 – Gilbert Anselme Girouard, politician (b.1846)
February 23 – Joseph-Édouard Cauchon, politician (b.1816)
April 8 – Susanna Moodie, writer (b.1803)  
May 8 – James Colledge Pope, politician and 5th Premier of Prince Edward Island (b.1826)
June 8 – Ignace Bourget, bishop of the Diocese of Montreal (b.1799)
July 17 – Jean-Charles Chapais, politician (b.1811)
August 18 – Francis Hincks, politician (b.1807)
November 5 – David Anderson, Church of England priest and bishop of Rupert's Land (b.1814)
November 16 – Louis Riel, politician and Métis leader (b.1844)

Historical documents
Account of battle at Duck Lake

Account of battle at Cut Knife Hill

Two settler women travel with Chief Big Bear's Cree band after Frog Lake Massacre

Accounts of battle at Batoche

Opposition Leader Edward Blake's speeches on fighting in Northwest

Convicted of treason, Chief Big Bear pleads for relief of his people

Louis Riel's statement at his trial

Report of psychiatric physician who visited Louis Riel in prison

Newspaper report of Louis Riel's execution

Air clears when women vote in Ontario municipal election

Montrealers' resistance to vaccination during smallpox outbreak turns to rioting

Illustration: vaccinating passengers against smallpox on train to U.S.A.

Photo: Sitting Bull, while on visit to Montreal with Buffalo Bill's Wild West show

References
  

 
Years of the 19th century in Canada
Canada
Canada